Gilbert High School may refer to any of the following:
 Gilbert High School (Arizona) in Gilbert, Arizona, United States
 Gilbert Junior-Senior High School in Gilbert, Iowa, United States
 Gilbert High School (South Carolina) in Gilbert, South Carolina, United States
 Eveleth-Gilbert Senior School in Eveleth, Minnesota, United States
 Matthew Gilbert High School, now Matthew Gilbert Middle School in Jacksonville, Florida, United States